Dean Ralph Laing (born 18 September 1970) is a former South African cricketer who played for Transvaal between 1988 and 1998. He also made one appearance for Nottinghamshire.

A right-handed batsman and right-arm medium pace bowler, Laing was educated at Jeppe High School for Boys in Johannesburg and played junior representative cricket for South Africa Schools in the 1987–88 season.

His uncle, Kenneth Cooper, played for Natal in the 1970s and was South African Cricketer of the Year for 1981.

References

External links

1970 births
Cricketers from Durban
South African cricketers
Gauteng cricketers
Nottinghamshire cricketers
Living people